Kushkabad may refer to:
 Kushkabad, Hamadan
 Kushkabad, Razavi Khorasan
 Kushkabad, alternate name of Kushk, South Khorasan
 Kushkabad, Zanjan

See also
Kashkabad (disambiguation)